The Centres for Economic Development, Transport and the Environment (ELY Centres, ; , 
) are local offices of the Finnish government placed in each of the regions of Finland. Finland has a total of 15 ELY Centres, which are tasked with promoting regional competitiveness, well-being and sustainable development and curbing climate change. They are distinct from Regional State Administrative Agencies, which cover multiple regions and are tasked with law enforcement and related duties instead.

ELY Centres have three areas of responsibility:

 Business and industry, labour force, competence and cultural activities
 Environment and natural resources
 Transport and infrastructure

The Centres for Economic Development, Transport and the Environment steer and supervise the activities of the TE Offices (Employment and Economic Development Offices, Finnish: työ- ja elinkeinotoimisto), which have similar tasks as Job Centres have in the UK. Not all ELY Centres deal with all three areas of responsibility as they can also manage duties on each other's behalf.

References

External links 
 
 Centre for Economic Development, Transport and the Environment - Prosperity, competitiveness, sustainable development (pdf, brochure)
 ELY Centres create sustainable well-being - strategy for 2012-2015 (pdf, brochure)

Government of Finland